Tuchubayevo (Tusıbay) is a rural locality (a selo) and the administrative centre of Tuchubayevsky Selsoviet, Baltachevsky District, Bashkortostan, Russia. The population was 381 as of 2010. There are 2 streets.

Geography 
Tuchubayevo is located 21 km west of Starobaltachevo (the district's administrative centre) by road. Verkhnekansiyarovo is the nearest rural locality.

References 

Rural localities in Baltachevsky District